The Annual Review of Nutrition is a peer-reviewed scientific journal published by Annual Reviews that releases an annual volume of review articles about nutrition. It has been in publication since 1981.  As of 2022, Journal Citation Reports gives the journal a 2021 impact factor of 9.323, ranking it fourth of 90 journals in the category "Nutrition & Dietetics". The current editors are Patrick J. Stover and Rudi Balling.

History
For the first twenty-nine years of publication, the Annual Review of Biochemistry contained a chapter related to human nutrition. The growing breadth of subjects to cover in each volume grew too large, however, and nutrition was largely dropped from the journal and omitted from any journal title published by the nonprofit publishing company Annual Reviews. The board of directors thus decided that nutrition warranted its own journal, with the first volume of the Annual Review of Nutrition published in 1981. It was the twenty-fourth journal title published by Annual Reviews. As of 2021, it was published both in print and electronically.

Scope and indexing
The Annual Review of Nutrition defines its scope as covering significant developments in the field of nutrition and its subfields such as macronutrients (proteins, fats, and carbohydrates), bioenergetics, micronutrients, metabolic regulation, nutritional genomics, clinical nutrition, nutritional anthropology, epidemiology, toxicology, and nutrition as it pertains to public health. Each volume includes a prefatory chapter written by a prominent nutrition scientist, reflecting on their careers and accomplishments. As of 2022, Journal Citation Reports gives the journal a 2021 impact factor of 9.323, ranking it fourth of 90 journals in the category "Nutrition & Dietetics". It is abstracted and indexed in Scopus, Science Citation Index Expanded, PASCAL, CINAHL, MEDLINE, EMBASE, and Academic Search, among others.

Editorial processes
The Annual Review of Nutrition is helmed by the editor or the co-editors. The editor is assisted by the editorial committee, which includes associate editors, regular members, and occasionally guest editors. Guest members participate at the invitation of the editor, and serve terms of one year. All other members of the editorial committee are appointed by the Annual Reviews board of directors and serve five-year terms. The editorial committee determines which topics should be included in each volume and solicits reviews from qualified authors. Unsolicited manuscripts are not accepted. Peer review of accepted manuscripts is undertaken by the editorial committee.

Editors of volumes
Dates indicate publication years in which someone was credited as a lead editor or co-editor of a journal volume. The planning process for a volume begins well before the volume appears, so appointment to the position of lead editor generally occurred prior to the first year shown here. An editor who has retired or died may be credited as a lead editor of a volume that they helped to plan, even if it is published after their retirement or death. 

 William J. Darby (1981–1984)
 Robert E. Olson (1985–1994)
 Donald B. McCormick (Appointed as of July 1, 1994; credited 1995–2004)
 Robert J. Cousins (2005–2014; retired 2014; also credited 2015–2016)
 Patrick J. Stover and Barbara A. Bowman (Appointed 2015;  credited 2017)
 Stover and Rudi Balling (2018–present)

Current editorial board
As of 2022, the editorial committee consists of two co-editors and the following members:

 Cheryl A. M. Anderson
 Bo Angelin
 Tracy G. Anthony
 William S. Blaner
 Yan Chen
 Cutberto Garza
 Vadim N. Gladyshev
 John P. Kirwan
 Zhaoping Li
 Mary Story

References

 

Publications established in 1981
Nutrition and dietetics journals
Nutrition
English-language journals
Annual journals